Madonna and Child with Saints is a c.1665 oil on canvas painting by Giovanni Marracci, now in Madonna del Carmine church in Pescaglia. It was commissioned by Paolino Galgani of Piazzanello in 1665. The saints are Paolino, Lucy, Philip Neri, Anthony the Great, Anthony of Padua and Elizabeth of Hungary.

References

1665 paintings
Paintings of the Madonna and Child
Paintings of Saint Lucy
Paintings of Anthony of Padua
Paintings of Anthony the Great